Obulavaripalle–Krishnapatnam branch line is a railway section project in South Central Railway zone, which connects Obulavaripalle of Kadapa district and  of Nellore district in the Indian state of Andhra Pradesh. Further, this section intersects Howrah–Chennai main line, Guntakal–Renigunta section and Nadikudi–Srikalahasti section. On 2 March 2014, – part of the section was commissioned.

References

External links 

Rail transport in Andhra Pradesh

Transport in Kadapa district
Transport in Nellore district
5 ft 6 in gauge railways in India